Naisse mac Cithruadh, Irish musician, died 1561.

Biography

The Annals of Loch Ce, sub anno 1561, contain a reference to Naisse and his wife, and their deaths on Lough Gill:

Naisse, the son of Cithruadh, the most eminent musician that was in Erinn, was drowned on Loch-Gile, and his wife, the daughter of Mac Donnchadha, and Athairne, the son of Matthew Glas; and the son of O'Duibhgennain was a great loss.

See also

 Daithí Ó Drónaí, experimental musician, born 1991.
 Donnchadh Ó Hámsaigh, harper, 1695 – 5 or 11 November 1807.
 Donell Dubh Ó Cathail, harper to Elizabeth I, c. 1560s-c.1660.
 Maol Ruanaidh Cam Ó Cearbhaill, murdered Saturday 10 June 1329.
 Tuotilo, monk and composer, c. 850 – c.915.

References

 Music and musicians in medieval Irish society, Ann Buckley, pp. 165–190, Early Music xxviii, no.2, May 2000
 Music in Prehistoric and Medieval Ireland, Ann Buckley, pp. 744–813, in A New History of Ireland, volume one, Oxford, 2005

External links
  http://www.ucc.ie/celt/published/T100010B/index.html

16th-century Irish musicians
1561 deaths
Musicians from County Sligo
People from County Leitrim
Year of birth unknown